Jonathan Tivadar Soros (born September 10, 1970) is the founder and chief executive officer of JS Capital Management LLC, a private investment firm. Prior to that, Soros worked at Soros Fund Management in daily operations and was co-deputy chairman of the organization.

He has been a prominent donor to Democratic and progressive political causes.  Soros started the Friends of Democracy PAC, now merged into Every Voice, to push for campaign finance reform and the abolition of the electoral college.

Early life and education

Soros's parents are Annaliese Witschak and business magnate George Soros, who divorced in 1981. He is the brother of Andrea and Robert Soros and half-brother of Gregory and Alexander, from his father's second marriage to Susan Weber.

He received a bachelor of arts from Wesleyan University in  Middletown, Connecticut in 1992. He received a master in public policy and a juris doctor from Harvard University.

Career

Early career 
Soros worked for a federal judge as a law clerk before joining Soros Fund Management.

Soros Fund 
Soros worked at Soros Fund Management beginning in 2002 and in 2004, he and his brother, Robert, became co-deputy chairmen of the organization that managed $12.8 billion in funds at that time. Their father stepped down at that time, but remained as chairman.

He focused on operations and was the organization's chief investment officer until he stepped down in 2011. His father said that Jonathan was "the principal architect of our transition to a healthy and stable investment operation" out of a turbulent financial period. However, that year, the organization had incurred "significant losses" and had converted to a family office—managing the funds of George, his foundation, and Soros family members— and no longer operating as a hedge fund. In the process, its investors received $1 billion from the fund. Reuters states that the move was made to avoid a deadline to register at the U.S. Securities and Exchange Commission as an investment manager. Jonathan remained on the board of his father's foundation.

JS Financial
Soros is the founder and chief executive officer of JS Capital Management LLC, a private investment firm, located in midtown Manhattan near Central Park. The second quarter 2015 filings showed that the U.S. assets in its portfolio were valued at $500 million, up from $394.76 million the previous quarter. In 2015, Bloomberg Politics identified him as one of the hedge fund titans.

Political advocacy

Campaign reform
He advocates for the removal of the electoral college, which he says is undemocratic and unconstitutional. This is the position of the Every Voice political advocacy group and the National Popular Vote Interstate Compact that advocates for electoral votes to be given to each state based upon certified results of the popular vote.

In July 2012, Soros started and funded Friends of Democracy PAC (now merged into Every Voice), a hybrid political action committee and super PAC designed to push for campaign finance reform that would mandate a public financing system for all federal elections. Soros's organization was described as an "anti-super PAC super PAC" by The Washington Post. Founded with Ilyse Hogue, formerly with Media Matters for America and MoveOn.org, and David Donnelly, executive director of the Public Campaign Action Fund, the goal of the organization is to elect candidates that support campaign reform, including public matching funds for elections.

Its strategy is to identify 10 to 15 districts where incumbent senators or congressmen have not supported "citizen-led" elections, and use multiple forms of media—like television ads, direct mail, phone calls, internet ads—to communicate the lawmaker's position on campaign funding. For instance, Soros, the organization's largest contributor, helped fund the 2012 election of Cecilia Tkaczyk, who supports changes to funding for state elections by implementing a system of public financing. She won by a small margin, in a district that historically elected Republicans.

By 2014, he gave $2 million over a few years to support initiatives and candidates, and a total of $3.7 million was spent by Soros for Democratic candidates by October of that year. Seven of the eight candidates that the PAC chose to back were elected in 2014. He is a member of Democracy Alliance, an organization that funds Democratic campaigns. The American Prospect said of him, "Jonathan Soros has emerged in recent years as a savvy donor and operative, much more hands-on than his father, George, the billionaire investor and Democratic donor."

He backed two state legislative initiatives in 2016 to reform campaign financing, one in the state of Washington and the other in South Dakota. Washington Initiative 1464 would have provided $150 for each voter to contribute towards a candidate of their choice and limited contributions by government contractors and lobbyists. It did not pass. However, South Dakota's Government Accountability and Anti-Corruption Act was successful.

Other groups
Soros has worked with MoveOn.org and other political advocacy groups. He is a senior fellow at the Roosevelt Institute and a member of the board of directors of the New America Foundation and the Open Society Foundations. He is a donor to the Democracy Alliance.

He supports the New York Leadership for Accountable Government, formed about 2012. By March 2013, he supported small donor democracy, in which small-dollar campaign contributions are multiple-matched to increase participation by citizens and donor diversity.

He contributed to Hillary Clinton and Martin O'Malley's presidential campaigns in 2015. In 2016, he donated $1 million to the Planned Parenthood Super PAC, which supported the Hillary Clinton presidential campaign.

Personal life
Soros married Jennifer Allan in 1997, who was a social worker when they met. The two first met while working for the 1992 Clinton-Gore presidential campaign. Beginning in 2000, the couple lived in a townhouse in the West Village of Manhattan.

Notes

See also
 George Soros
 Open Society Foundations
 Tides Foundation

References

Further reading
 
 
 
 

1970 births
Living people
Place of birth missing (living people)
American chief executives of financial services companies
American financial analysts
American financial company founders
American financiers
American hedge fund managers
American money managers
American people of Hungarian-Jewish descent
American political fundraisers
American stock traders
Harvard Law School alumni 
New York (state) Democrats
Jonathan
Stock and commodity market managers
Wesleyan University alumni
American people of German descent
People from Greenwich Village
Harvard Kennedy School alumni